François van der Delft (c. 1500 – 21 June 1550), was Imperial ambassador to the court of Henry VIII of England from 1545 to 1547 and ambassador to the court of Edward VI of England from 1547 to 1550.

Van der Delft came to England in 1545 to represent Charles V. In the summer of 1545, after Chapuys' departure, he was officially introduced to King Henry aboard the Henry Grace à Dieu shortly before the Battle of the Solent. Under Edward VI, in 1550, as the Privy Council put pressure on Princess Mary to restrain the usage of her mass, van der Delft suggested to her to flee England. He was recalled before anything came of this plan, and died shortly afterwards. He was replaced as ambassador by Jean Scheyfve.

Notes

References
Beer, B.L. (1973): Northumberland: The Political Career of John Dudley, Earl of Warwick and Duke of Northumberland The Kent State University Press 
Hutchinson, Robert (2006): The Last Days of Henry VIII: Conspiracy, Treason and Heresy at the Court of the dying Tyrant Phoenix 

People of the Tudor period
Ambassadors to England
1500s births
1550 deaths
Year of birth uncertain
16th-century diplomats
Ambassadors of the Holy Roman Empire
16th-century people of the Holy Roman Empire